Lee Roy Kunz (born April 21, 1957) is a former American football linebacker who played three seasons for the Chicago Bears. He played every game during his three seasons in the National Football League (NFL).

References

1957 births
Living people
Chicago Bears players
American football linebackers
Players of American football from Colorado
Nebraska Cornhuskers football players
People from Golden, Colorado